Steven Takahashi (born 8 April 1992) is a Canadian freestyle wrestler. In 2018, he won the silver medal in the men's 57 kg event at the 2018 Commonwealth Games held in Gold Coast, Australia. He is the son of Olympic wrestler Ray Takahashi, nephew of Olympic judo competitor Phil Takahashi and coach Tina Takahashi, and grandson of influential judoka Masao Takahashi.

Career 

In 2011, he won one of the bronze medals in the men's freestyle 55 kg event at the 2011 Pan American Games held in Guadalajara, Mexico.

In 2016, he won one of the bronze medals in the men's 57 kg event at the 2016 World University Wrestling Championships held in Çorum, Turkey. In 2017, he won the gold medal in the men's 57 kg event at the 2017 Francophone Games held in Abidjan, Ivory Coast.

Major results

References

External links 
 

Living people
1992 births
Place of birth missing (living people)
Canadian male sport wrestlers
Wrestlers at the 2011 Pan American Games
Pan American Games medalists in wrestling
Pan American Games bronze medalists for Canada
Wrestlers at the 2018 Commonwealth Games
Commonwealth Games medallists in wrestling
Commonwealth Games silver medallists for Canada
Medalists at the 2011 Pan American Games
20th-century Canadian people
21st-century Canadian people
Medallists at the 2018 Commonwealth Games